Americans for UNFPA's name was changed to Friends of UNFPA in 2012.

Friends of UNFPA identifies itself as an organization which "supports the health and dignity of women everywhere." This U.S.-based NGO was formed in 1998 (as "The U.S. Committee for the United Nations Population Fund") to raise political and financial support within the United States for the work of the United Nations Population Fund (UNFPA).

During the Bush Administration, Friends of UNFPA advocated for the administration to restore United States funding to UNFPA, which President Bush had withheld for seven years for a total of $244 million. (Like all UN agencies, UNFPA is funded by voluntary contributions.) Currently, Americans for UNFPA advocates for fighting for the United States to contribute a significant contribution to UNFPA to "signal a return of American leadership to global women's health".

UNFPA provides women's health care and promotes the rights of women in more than 140 countries around the world, making it the largest multilateral source of such assistance. UNFPA's support of women's health care includes family planning, maternal health and HIV prevention programs. Additionally, UNFPA programs prevent gender-based violence and promote girls' access to education.

Friends of UNFPA is headquartered in New York, with offices in Washington, D.C., and Seattle. Its president is Valerie DeFillipo.

References

External links
 http://www.friendsofunfpa.org
 Americans for UNFPA
 Get Involved with Americans for UNFPA
 UNFPA

Political advocacy groups in the United States
United Nations Population Fund